Chris Wilkerson is an American college football coach. He is the head football coach at Eastern Illinois University a position he assumed in 2022, succeeding Adam Cushing. He served as the head football coach at the University of Chicago from 2013 to 2021. A graduate of Eastern Illinois, Wilkerson was an assistant football coach at his alma mater as well as San Jose State University and Dartmouth College.

Head coaching record

References

External links
 Eastern Illinois profile
 Chicago profile

Year of birth missing (living people)
Living people
American football defensive tackles
Chicago Maroons football coaches
Dartmouth Big Green football coaches
Eastern Illinois Panthers football coaches
Eastern Illinois Panthers football players
San Jose State Spartans football coaches